Nizhnyaya Dobrinka is a rural locality (a selo) and the administrative center of Michurinskoye Rural Settlement, Kamyshinsky District, Volgograd Oblast, Russia. The population was 1,091 as of 2010. There are 11 streets.

Geography 
Nizhnyaya Dobrinka is located on the right bank of the Dobrinka River, 47 km northeast of Kamyshin (the district's administrative centre) by road. Verkhnyaya Dobrinka is the nearest rural locality.

References 

Rural localities in Kamyshinsky District